Typically, historians of the auxiliary sciences of history have also produced historical works on the Crusades.

Archaeology and related topics 

This section provides an overview those authors whose work was in the areas of archaeological exploration; historical geography and cartography; numismatics and sigillography; and document analysis techniques. In particular:

 Archaeological disciplines have contributed to the understanding of the history of the Crusades by verifying or refuting accounts presented in original sources. Particular emphasis has been on Crusader castles, history of the art of the period, and document analysis techniques such as palaeography (the study of historic writing systems), diplomatics (the critical analysis of document), and epigraphy (the study of inscriptions).
 The disciples of numismatics, the study of coins and other money, and sigillography, the study of seals of Byzantium and the Latin East, play an important role in interpreting histories. The coinage of Outremer that has been studied are the coins of the Kingdom of Jerusalem, the Frankish Syria, and those of the Islamic world, including Frankish imitiations.
 Archaeoseismology, the study of earthquakes’ impact in archaeology, has a role in history in the correlation between scientific results as compared to historical documents. Other physical phenomena, such as solar eclipses and comets, have relevance in the study of history because of their depiction in written sources and correlation with archaeological finds. In the Crusader period, both Western and Arabic sources have described the chronology and impact of these natural phenomena, and the comparative analyses done by modern historians and scientists have played a role in deciphering descriptions of events. In particular, the destruction of the Church of the Holy Sepulchre in 1009 was equated with many calamities including earthquakes (in 1015, 1016) and comets (in 1029).

In his seminal article in the Catholic Encyclopedia, French historian Louis R. Bréhier (1869–1951) identified archaeological, cartographical and numismatics sources as a key for historical understanding of the Crusades. Principal authors and their works are identified below. Many of these overlap with historians and travelers discussed in the companion articles in Historians and histories of the Crusades, and many of the works meet multiple categories in the overall work.

Archaeology 
Leaders in the field of archaeology as it relates to the Crusades include the following.

Emmanuel Guillaume-Rey. Emmanuel Guillaume-Rey (1837–1913), a French archaeologist, topographer and orientalist who wrote seminal works on the archaeology of the Holy Land.

 Étude historique et topographique de la tribu de Juda (1862). A historical and topographical study of the tribe of Judah.
 Etude sur les monuments de l'architecture militaire des croisés en Syrie et dans l'île de Chypre (1871). A study on the monuments of the military architecture of the Crusaders in Syria and on Cyprus
 Étude sur la topographie de la ville d'Acre au XIIIe siècle (1879). A study of the topography of Acre in the thirteenth century.

Max van Berchem. Max van Berchem (1863–1921), a Swiss epigraphist and historian. He was the pioneer in the use of Arabic inscriptions in historical analysis.

 Matériaux pour un Corpus Inscriptionum Arabicarum (1894). A reference work on Arabic inscriptions. With French orientalist Gaston Wiet and German Iranologist Ernst Emil Herzfeld.
 Epigraphie des Assassins de Syrie (1897). The epigraphs of the Assassins of Syria during the time of Louis IX of France and the Seventh Crusade (1248–1254).
 Monuments et inscriptions de lʾatābek Luʾluʾ de Mossoul (1906). Monuments and inscriptions of the Armenian ruler of Mosul Badr al-Din Lu'lu' (died 1259).
 Épigraphie des Atabeks de Damas (1909). Epigraphs of the atabegs of Damascus from Atsiz ibn Abaq through Toghtekin (1076–1128).

Jean Mabillon. Jean Mabillon (1632–1707), a French Benedictine monk and scholar of the Congregation of Saint Maur. One of the greatest historical scholar of the 17th century, he is considered to be the founder of the disciplines of palaeography and diplomatics.

 De re diplomatica (1681). An analysis of medieval documents and manuscripts back to the early 7th century. (cf. French Wikipedia, De re diplomatica)

Bernard de Montfaucon. Bernard de Montfaucon (1655–1741), a Benedictine monk and scholar who is considered one of the founders of archaeology and palaeography.

 Bibliotheca Coisliniana (1705). An examination of ancient and medieval Greek writings.
 L'antiquité expliquée et représentée en figures (Antiquity Explained and Represented in Diagrams), 15 volumes (1719–1724).

Abd al-Latif. Abd al-Latif al-Baghdadi (1162–1231) was an Arab physician, historian and traveler who wrote numerous works including Account of Egypt in two parts that is an early work on archaeology and Egyptology. His work was discovered by English orientalist Edward Pococke. Abd al-Latif's autobiography is found in RHC Historiens orientaux.

Numismatics and sigillography 
Principal contributors to numismatics and sigillography as they are relevant to the study of the Crusades include the following.

Louis Félicien de Saulcy. Louis Félicien de Saulcy (1807–1880), a French historian, numismatist and archaeologist.

 Numismatique des croisades (1847). A study that was a pioneering work on the coins of the Crusader era.

Gustave Schlumberger. Gustave Schlumberger (1844–1929), a French historian and numismatist of the Crusades and Byzantine empire. His classic study of coins Numismatique de l'Orient Latin (1878) is the standard reference.

 Numismatique des croisades. Monnaie inédite des seigneurs du Toron en Syrie (1875).
 Sigillographie de l'Orient latin (1877). Continued by French Byzantinist Ferdinand Chalandon (1875–1921).
 Numismatique de l'Orient Latin , 2 volumes (1878–1882). The principal work on the coinage of the Crusades.
 Sigillographie de l'empire byzantin (1884). A compendium of Byzantine seals.

Monnaies à lé genres arabes de l’Orient Latin. Monnaies à lé genres arabes de l’Orient latin (1958) by Paul Balog and Jacques Yvon (1923–1983) is the standard reference for the classifications of coins in Arabic from the Crusader era.

Archaeoseismology 
Examples of earthquakes that have been noted in Crusader historical sources including Latin historians Fulcher of Chartres, Walter the Chancellor and William of Tyre, Syriac sources Michael the Syrian and the anonymous 1224 Chronicle, and Arab historians including Ibn al-Qalanisi, Abū Shāma and ibn al-Athir (who identified 25 earthquakes in his works). Significant events include the 1114 Syrian earthquake, the 1138 Aleppo earthquake, the 1157 Hama earthquake, the 1170 Syrian earthquake and the 1202 Syrian earthquake. The observations of comets and meteors in medieval histories includes both the physical and temporal traits of the objects as well as their view as portents of good or bad luck. The most famous of these is Haley's Comet appearing in 1066 prior to the Battle of Hastings, recorded in the Anglo-Saxon Chronicle, among other sources. Other known sightings of comets are in 1097, 1105–1106 and 1110, and meteor storms in 1063 and 1193, as recorded by ibn al-Qalanisi, ibn al-Athir and others. Speculation that a sighting of the 1222 apparition of Haley's Comet, recorded by ibn al-Athir, may have caused Genghis Khan's invasion of the west are unfounded. Solar and lunar eclipses were recorded in numerous historical texts including that of ibn al-Jawzi, ibn al-Athir and Michael the Syrian. Noted solar eclipses are those in 1061, 1176 and 1283, and lunar eclipses recorded in 1117 and 1226.

Biography 
The use of biography in the study of Crusades history has been surprising limited, with major biographies focused on a few larger-than-life figures, include of Godfrey of Bouillon, Richard I of England (Richard the Lionheart, Richard Cœur de Lion), Saladin and Louis IX of France (Saint Louis). Important biographies and biographical studies include the following.

Nomitia Historica. Godefridus Bullonius Nomitia Historica is a biography of Godfrey of Bouillon first appearing in Histoire littéraire de la France, tom. VIII.  It draws on the works of William of Tyre and Orderic Vitalis. In the Patrologia Latina edition, the work appears with editions of:  Gesta Tancredi (Radulph of Caen); Historia Francorum qui ceperunt Iherusalem (Raymond of Aguilers); Historia Hierosolymitana (Robert the Monk), Historia de Hierosolymitano itinere (Peter Tudebode), with Joannis Besly Pictonis Præfatio; Historia Hierosolymitana (Fulcher of Chartres); Historia gestorum viæ nostri temporis Hierosolymitanæ (Gilo of Toucy); Bella Antiochena (Walter the Chancellor); Liber Locorum Sanctorum Terræ Jerusalem (Rorgo Fretellus); Descriptio terrae sanctae (John of Würzburg); and Narrativ brevis belli sacri (Anonymous). In Patrologia Latin (MPL) 155 [Godefridum, Appendix II].Historia Gotfridi. Historia et Gesta Ducis Gotfridi seu historia de desidione Terræ sanctæ by anonymous German authors (Anonymi Rhenani) covers the First Crusade and the period from 1106-1191. It is derivative of the works of Bartolf of Nangis, Robert the Monk, Jacques de Vitry and Oliver of Paderborn, and was published in 1141. In RHC Historiens occidentaux, Volume 5.X.

Itinerarium Regis Ricardi. The anonymous Itinerarium Regis Ricardi (Itnerarium Peregrinarum et Gesta Regis Ricardi) compiled by Richard de Templo and once attributed to medieval grammarian Geoffrey of Vinsauf, is an account to the Third Crusade from 1189 to 1192, with well-regarded accounts of Saladin's conquest of Jerusalem and the subsequent campaign of Richard I of England.

Ambroise of Normandy. Ambroise of Normandy (fl. 1190) was a Norman poet and chronicler who wrote of the Third Crusade in his Old French poems.)

 L´Estoire de la guerre sainte and Itinerarium regis Ricardi. Both works are regarded as historical sources of Richard I of England, beginning with his taking the cross as Count of Poitou in 1187. In Monumenta Germaniae Historica (MGH) Scriptores XXVII.

Richard of Devizes. Richard of Devizes (fl. 1190),  an English chronicler and monk.

 Chronicon de rebus gestis Ricardi Primi, covering the reign of Richard I of England from 1189 to 1192.

Roger of Howden. Roger of Howden (fl. 1174–1201), an English chronicler who accompanied Richard I of England on the Third Crusade.

 Gesta Regis Ricardi. Provides insight into the aftermath of the loss of Jerusalem in Europe, with Joscius of Tyre attempting to reconcile Henry II of England and Philip II of France at the conference at Gisors. His work was previously attributed to Benedict of Peterborough.

Jean de Joinville. Jean de Joinville (1224–1317), a French chronicler who accompanied Louis IX of France on the Seventh Crusade and Eighth Crusade who wrote his influential biography.

 Life of Saint Louis (1309), a biography of Louis IX of France, relying on the Grandes Chroniques de France for events after 1254. Joinville was with Louis during his captivity by the Egyptians in 1250 after the battle of al-Mansurah. Reprinted in Bohn's Libraries and in Chronicles of the Crusades: contemporary narratives of the Crusade of Richard Coeur de Lion and of the Crusade of Saint Louis (1903).

Philippe de Mézières. Philippe de Mézières (c. 1327 – 1405), a French knight and author. De Mézières travelled to Jerusalem and the Cyprus.

 Vie de Saint Pierre Thomas (1366). Life of saint Peter Thomas (1305–1366), who participated with de Mézières in the Alexandrian Crusade of 1365.
Ibn Shaddad. Izz al-Din ibn Shaddad (1217–1285), an Aleppan geographer employed by the Ayyubids.

 Ta'rikh al-Malik al-zahir, a biography of Baibars, Mamluk sultan of Egypt.

Ibn Abd al-Zahir. Ibn Abd al-Zahir (1223–1293), also known as Muhi ad-Din ibn Abdazzahir, was an Egyptian historian who wrote extensively of the Mamluk sultans as well as a geographical study.

 Lives of Baibars and Qalawun. A biography of sultans Baibars and al-Mansur Qalawun.

Abu'l-Mahāsin. Abu'l-Mahāsin Yūsuf (1411–1469), an Arabic historian who was a student of Egyptian historian al-Makrizi (1364–1442).

 Anecdotes and good habits of the life of the Sultan Youssof. A biography of Saladin. In RHC Historiens orientaux, Volume 3.

Pierre d'Aubusson. Pierre d'Aubusson (1423–1503), Grand Master of the Knights Hospitaller from 1476 to 1503. Commander of the garrison opposing the Turks during the siege of Rhodes in 1480.

 Histoire de Pierre d'Aubusson (1667) by French Jesuit Dominique Bouhours (1628–1702). The life of the renowned Peter d'Aubusson, grandmaster of Rhodes: Containing those two remarkable sieges of Rhodes by Mahomet the Great, and Solyman the Magnificent. Accounts of the sieges of Rhodes in 1480 and 1522 made by Mehmed II and Suleiman the Magnificent, respectively.

Reinier Reineck. Reinier Reineck (1541-1595), a German historian. (cf. German Wikipedia, Reiner Reineccius)

 Historia De Vita Imp. Caes. Henrici IIII (1581). A biography of Henry IV of France.
 Chronicon Hierosolymitanum, id est, De bello sacro historia, exposita libris XII & nunc primum in lucem edita( 1584). A collection of Crusader sources with a commentary by German historian Matthäus Dresser.

Thomas Fuller. Thomas Fuller (1608–1661), an English churchman and historian.

 The History of the Worthies of England, 3 volumes (1662). An attempt at a dictionary of national biography, from original sources and providing valuable antiquarian information.

Pierre Bayle. Pierre Bayle (1647–1706), a French philosopher, author, and lexicographer.

 Dictionnaire historique et critique, 2 volumes (1697). A French biographical dictionary also known as the Historical and Critical Dictionary, regarded as one of the earliest encyclopedias. Based on the previous La Grand Dictionnaire historique by theologian Louis Moréri (1643–1680). Numerous editions with improvements from 1792 through 1830. The nouvelle édition by Adrien-Jean-Quentin Beuchot was published in 16 volumes in 1820.

John Selden. John Selden (1584–1654), an English orientalist and polymath.

 Contextia Gemmarum sive Eutychii Patriarchae Alexandrini Annales, 2 volumes (1658–1659). A biography of Eutychius of Alexandria, Melkite patriarch of Alexandria. The Latin translation was reprinted in Patrologia Graeco-Latina (MPG), Volume 111. With Edward Pococke (1604–1691).

Antoine Galland. Antoine Galland (1646 –1715), a French orientalist and archaeologist.

 Bibliothèque Orientale, ou dictionnaire universel contenant tout ce qui regarde la connoissance des peuples de l'Orient, 3 volumes (1697). Edited by Barthélemy d'Herbelot (1625–1695) and completed by Antoine Galland (1646 –1715). Derived from the bibliographic encyclopedia Kaşf az-Zunūn by Kâtip Çelebi, it contains a large number of Arabic, Turkish and Persian compilations and manuscripts.

Eusèbe Renaudot. Eusèbe Renaudot (1646–1720), a French theologian and orientalist.

 Life of Saladin (unpublished).

William Robertson. William Robertson (1721–1793), a Scottish historian.

 History of the Reign of the Emperor Charles the Fifth, 3 volumes (1769). An account of the reign of Holy Roman Emperor Charles V, who ruled 1519–1556. Volume 1 covers the period from the subversion of the Roman empire until the beginning of the 16th century. This includes an account of what Robertson calls the "dark ages" of 700–1100, covering the First Crusade. The later Crusades through 1291 are covered as well as later activities against the Turks in the Smyrniote Crusades (1343–1351). In addition, the privileges and indulgences of the Crusades are discussed. Volume 2 begins with the birth of Charles in 1500 and goes through 1541. Volume 3 continues through 1557.

Joseph Toussaint Reinaud. Joseph Toussaint Reinaud (1795–1867), a French orientalist.

 Notice sur la vie de Saladin: sultan d'Egypte et de Syrie (1824). A short biographical work on Saladin.

Gabriel Mailhard de La Couure. Gabriel Mailhard de La Couture (19th century), a French writer.

 Godefroy de Bouillon et la Première Croisade. A biography of Godfrey of Bouillon.

Joseph François Michaud. Joseph François Michaud (1767–1839), a French historian and publisist, specializing in the Crusades. In 1830, he travelled to the Holy Land in order provide more realistic accounts of his Histoire des Croisades.

 Biographie universelle, ancienne et moderne, 45 volumes (1843–1865). A biographical dictionary.

Jean Joseph François Poujoulat. Jean Joseph François Poujoulat (1808–1880), a French historian and journalist.

 Histoire de Richard Ier Cœur de Lion, duc d'Aquitaine et de Normandie, roi d'Angleterre (1837). A biography of Richard I of England.

Celestia Angenette Bloss. Celestia Angenette Bloss (1812–1855), an American teacher and historian.

 Heroines of the Crusades (1857). A stylized history of women important to the Crusades including Adela of Blois, Eleanor of Aquitaine, Berengaria of Navarre, Isabella of Angoulême, Isabella II (Violante) of Jerusalem, and Eleanor of Castile.

G. P. R. James. George Payne Rainsford James (1799–1860), an English novelist and historical writer, holding the honorary office of British Historiographer Royal.

 The History of Chivalry (1830). An account of the Crusades, beginning with the rise of chivalry. Includes: the first three Crusades, with vivid descriptions of the major battles; the death of Saladin; the later Crusades and the loss of Acre; the decline of the military orders.
 The History of Charlemagne (1833).
 A History of the Life of Richard Coeur-de-Lion, King of England (1842).

Barbara Hutton. Barbara Hutton (fl. 1863–1892), an English author of juvenile works and biographies.

 Heroes of the Crusades (1869). A stylized history of heroes of the First through Third Crusades, from Peter the Hermit to Richard the Lionheart.

Jacob Isadore Mombert. Jacob Isadore Mombert (1829–1913), an American historian.

 Great Lives: A Course of History in Biographies (1886). Biographies from ancient to modern times, including one of Godfrey of Bouillon.

Henry George Bohn. Henry George Bohn (1796–1884), a British publisher.

 Bohn's Libraries (1846–1884). Editions of standard works and translations, dealing with history, science, classics, theology and archaeology.
 Chronicles of the Crusades (1848), in Bohn's Libraries. Two contemporary narratives of the Crusade of Richard Coeur de Lion and one of the Crusade at Saint Louis. Edited and translated by Thomas Johnes.

Leopold von Ranke. Leopold von Ranke (1795–1886), a German historian and a founder of modern source-based history.

 Heinrich IV, König von Frankreich. A biography of Henry IV, Holy Roman Emperor.

Reinhold Röhricht. Reinhold Röhricht (1842–1905), a German historian of the Crusades, regarded as a pioneer with fellow German historian Heinrich Hagenmeyer (1834–1915) in the history of the kingdom of Jerusalem, laying the foundation for modern Crusader research.

 Regesta Regni Hierosolymitani, MXCVII–MCCXCI (1893), with Additamentum (1904). The biographies of the kings of Jerusalem from 1097 to 1291.

Namik Kemal. Namik Kemal (1840–1880), a Turkish journalist and political activist. One of the founders of the modern Ottoman literature.

 Selâhaddini Eyyûbî (1872). First modern Muslim biography of Saladin.
 Celâleddin Harzemşah (1875). Biography of Jalal ad-Din Mingburnu (1199–1231), last shah of the Khwarezmian empire.
 Edebiyat i-Cedide (1884). Ottoman New Literature, includes three works: Salah al-Din – on sultan Saladin (1137-1193), Fatih – on sultan Mehmed II (1432–1481), and Sultan Selim (1470–1520).

Chronology 

The use of the chronology in describing history is a key tool in the understanding of the Crusades, especially given the multiple theaters and centuries under consideration. In support of this objective, the Medieval Chronicle Society was founded in 1999 to promote the study of medieval annals and chronicles and, in general, medieval historiography. The society publishes the on-line Encyclopedia of the Medieval Chronicle which includes many of the early chronicles of the Crusades or Crusader-related topics, as documented in the list of sources for the Crusades. The earliest known complete chronology of the Crusades to the Holy Land is found in Thomas Fuller's The Historie of the Holy Warre (1639), which remains an important resource through modern times.

One of the problems in this area is that of chronological synchronism, especially given the use of the Islamic calendar by Arabic-speaking historians. The use of archaeological finds as well as knowledge of historical earthquakes, solar eclipses and comets is particularly valuable in ascertaining the timeline of key events. Some of the more important chronologies are provided below.

Chronicon breve Hierosolymitanum. Chronicon breve Hierosolymitanum appears as Part 9 of Primi belli sacri Narrationes minors, which is Chapter VIII of Volume 5 of Recueil des historiens des croisades (RHC) Historiens occidentaux. At 10 lines, it is the shortest known chronology of the Crusades.

Modern chronologies. Numerous chronologies are available from modern historians, most online. The Routledge chronologies are only available in print form, but provide the most complete chronology of the totality of the Crusades.

 Chronology and Maps, in The Oxford History of the Crusades (1995), edited by Jonathan Riley-Smith.
 A Chronological Outline of the Crusades: Background, Military Expeditions, and Crusader States, in The Routledge Companion to the Crusades (2006), by historian Peter Lock.
 A Narrative Outline of the Crusade, ibid.
 The Crusades: A Chronology, in The Crusades—An Encyclopedia (2006), edited by Alan V. Murray.
 Important Dates and Events, 1049–1571, in History of the Crusades, Volume III, edited by Kenneth M. Setton (1975).

Guillaume de Nangis. Guillaume de Nangis (died 1300), a French chronicler and biographer, particularly of Louis IX of France and Phillip III of France.

 Chronicon (1300). A chronicle of the history of the world from the Creation until 1300. For the period before 1113, the work is that of the medieval author Sigebert of Gembloux (1030–1112) among others. It also borrows from La Chronique by Benedictine monk and historian Primat of Saint-Denis. A continuation to 1368 was done by Prior Jean de Venette.

Hayton of Corycus. Hayton of Corycus (1240–1310/1320), also known as Hethum of Gorigos, an Armenian noble and historian.

 Table Chronologique des Evénement en Syrie, Palestine et Arménie de 1076 à 1307 (1307). In RHC Documents arméniens (1869–1906).

Gérard de Monréal. Gérard de Monréal (fl. 1314–1321), secretary to Guillaume de Beaujeu, Grand Master of the Knights Templar from 1273 to 1291. Monréal is believed to have written the later part of Les Gestes des Chiprois (Deeds of the Cypriots), an Old French chronicle of the history of the Crusader states and Kingdom of Cyprus between 1132 and 1311.

 Les Gestes des Chiprois, 3 parts in 1 volume (1314–1321). A history of the Crusades in three parts: (1) Chronique de Terre Sainte (anonymous author) covering the period from 1131 to 1222; (2) History of the War between the Emperor Frederick and Sir John of Ibelin, covering the period 1223–1242, by Italian historian Philip of Novara(1200–1270); (3) Chronique du Templier de Tir, covering the Crusades through 1311. The work includes one of only two eyewitness accounts of the fall of Acre in 1291 and the trial of the Knights Templar in 1311.
 Les gestes des Chiprois: recueil de chroniques françaises écrites en Orient au XIIIe & XVIe siècles (1887). Translation for the Société de l'Orient Latin by French historian and philologist Gaston Raynaud (1850–1911). Raynaud's version of Les gestes des Chiprois is found in both RHC Documents arméniens (1869–1906), Volume 2.VI, and Revue de l'Orient Latin (ROL), Volumes XIIIe, XIVe.

Rashid-al-Din. Rashid-al-Din Hamadani (1247–1318), a Jewish-turned-Islamic physician and historian who was vizier to the Ilkhan Ghazan.

 Jāmiʿ al-Tawārīkh (Compendium of Chronicles) is a history of the Mongols from the time of Adam until 1311. The books include History of the Mongols, regarding the Khanate conquests from Genghis Khan through that of Ghazan. They also include the History of the Franks through 1305, based on sources such as Italian explorer Isol the Pisan (fl. 1300) and the Chronicon pontificum et imperatorum of Martin of Opava. The third part of geography has been lost.
 A Compendium of Chronicles: Rashid al-Din's Illustrated History of the World (1995). Edition by American art historian Sheila Blair.

Jean Froissart. Jean Froissart (c. 1337 – c. 1405), a Belgian medieval author and court historian.

 Chronicles of England, France, and the Adjoining Countries, 5 volumes (c. 1400). Known as Froissart's Chronicles. From the latter part of the reign of Edward II to the coronation of Henry IV. Edition translated from the best French editions, with variations and additions from many celebrated manuscripts, edited by Jean-Baptiste de La Curne de Sainte-Palaye and Thomas Johnes.

Abu'l-Mahāsin. Abu'l-Mahāsin Yūsuf (1411–1469), an Arabic historian who was a student of Egyptian historian al-Makrizi (1364–1442).

 Nodjoum az-Zahireh is extracted in RHC Historiens orientaux and covers the years 1098–1157 although his chronology differs from the more accepted one of ibn al-Athir. Abu'l Mahāsin and ibn al-Athir both offer accounts of the expeditions of emperor Basil II to Syria in the late tenth century.
John Capgrave. John Capgrave (1393–1464), an English historian, hagiographer and theologian.

 The chronicle of England (1858). A chronology of history from the time of Adam until 1416. Edited by Carl Horstmann. Published by the authority of the lords commissioners of Her Majesty's Treasury, under the direction of the Master of the Rolls.

Grandes Chroniques de France. Grandes Chroniques de France, 6 volumes (1461). A compilation of the history of France produced between the 13th and 15th centuries by the monks of Saint-Denis. The original work, Roman des roisby a Benedictine monk and historian Primat of Saint-Denis (died between 1277 and 1285), traced the kings of the Franks from the origins until the death of Philip II of France in 1223 and extended at a later date to the death of Charles V of France in 1380. The edition by French philologist Alexis Paulin Paris was published 1836–1840.Robert Fabyan. Robert Fabyan (died 1513), an English draper of London, sheriff, alderman, and author.

 The New Chronicles of England and France, in two parts (1511). By Robert Fabyan (died 1513). Named by himself The concordance of histories. Edition of 1811 by Sir Henry Ellis reprinted from Pynson's edition of 1516. Sources used by Fabyan include the Brut Chronicle, the Venerable Bede, William of Malmesbury, Ranulf Higden, Henry of Huntingdon, and numerous other contributors to Crusader history.Heinrich Meibom. Heinrich Meibom (1638–1700), a German physician and scholar.

 Chronologie ad historiam belli sacri (1584). An early chronology and history of the Crusades.Thomas Fuller. Thomas Fuller (1608–1661), an English churchman and historian. Fuller's work was anti-Jewish and relied heavily on that of William of Tyre. It was the first to incorporate accounts of the military orders, the Albigensian Crusade and the Northern Crusades into his narrative.

 The Historie of the Holy Warre (1639). A history of the Crusades from the fall of Jerusalem under Titus in 70 AD through 1290. Includes critical commentary, a complete chronology, and bibliography. With an introduction by English classical scholar James Duport (1606–1679).
 The History of the Holy War. An 1840 edition of The Historie of the Holy Warre.Georg Christoph Müller. Georg Christoph Müller (1673–1721), a German historian. His work assigned five numbers to the Crusades. (cf. German Wikipedia, Georg Christoph Müller)

 De Expedition Cruciatis Vulgo Von Kreutz Fahrten (1709). A history of the Crusades in the time frames 1096-1099 (First Crusade), 1147-1149 (Second Crusade), 1189-1192 (Third Crusade), 1217-1229 (Fifth Crusade), and 1248-1254 (Seventh Crusade), considering just those large expeditions that reached the eastern Mediterranean. Source document for Hagenmeyer's edition of Anonymi gesta Francorum et aliorum Hierosolymitanorum (1890).Edward Gibbon. Edward Gibbon (1737–1794), an English historian. Gibbon presented the Crusades as "heroism as a cultural rather than merely personal feature, an active energy that, once freed of savage fanaticism, offered future advantages to the West." He was among the first to assign numbers to the First through Seventh Crusades and treat them unequivocally as a movement.

 History of the Decline and Fall of the Roman Empire, 6 volumes (1776–1789). Later editions edited by English historian Henry H. Milman (1791–1868) and by British historian J. B. Bury (1861-1927). Gibbon's view of the Crusades focused on the clash of religions and cultures.Gibbon, E., Bury, J. B. (John Bagnell). (18971900). The history of the decline and fall of the Roman empire. New ed. London: Methuen.
 The Crusades, A.D. 1095–1261 (1869). Excerpts from Gibbon's main tome (Chapters LIX, LX). History of the Holy Land from the time of the Fatimid and Abbasid caliphates and Seljuk sultanate, the lure of the pilgrimage, and the chronology from the First Crusade 1096 until the recovery of Constantinople by the Greeks in 1261, and the loss of Acre in 1291. Additions on chivalry by English historian Henry Hallam (1777–1859. With an essay on chivalry and romance by Scottish novelist Sir Walter Scott and a discussion of the siege of Rhodes in 1480 through the translation of Gulielmus Caoursin's Obsidionis Rhodiæ urbis descriptio (edition 1490) by English poet John Caius.Giovanni Filippo Mariti. Giovanni Filippo Mariti (1736–1806), an Italian antiquarian, scientist and historian. (cf. Italian Wikipedia, Giovanni Mariti)Bibliothèque nationale de France {BnF Data}. "Giovanni Mariti (1736-1806)".

 Cronologia de' Re Latini di Gerusalemme (1784). Chronology of the Latin Kings of Jerusalem, from Godfrey of Bouillon through James III of Cyprus, who died as a child in 1474. The completion of his 1769 work on Cyprus, adding a chronology not only of all the Latin kings who had ruled the city of Jerusalem, but also of those who, having lost the dominion of the capital, continued to govern in Syria, on the island of Cyprus and in Armenia. He omits the research relating to the royal houses of Europe, which by inheritance still claimed the title of king of Jerusalem.Religious Tract Society. The Religious Tract Society was founded in London in 1799 to publish Christian literature.

 The Crusades (1800). A history of the Crusades from 622 to 1291. Numbered Crusades as First through Eighth, plus Last. Commentary on political and religious ramifications of the Crusades.Joseph François Michaud. Joseph François Michaud (1767–1839), a French historian and publisist, specializing in the Crusades. In 1830, he travelled to the Holy Land in order provide more realistic accounts of his Histoire. He was unable to complete the final edition.

 Histoire des Croisades, 3 volumes (1812–1822). Edited by his friend historian Jean J. F. Poujoulat (1808–1880). Updated to an improved edition with 4 volumes (or, 6 volumes in some printings) by Jean L. A. Huillard-Bréholles (Paris, 1862). A history of the Crusades that includes 40 appendices with original source material, primarily contemporary letters. Histoire has been regarded as the starting point of modern Crusades studies and it was under the influence of this publication that the Académie des Inscriptions et Belles-Lettres decided to publish the collection of historians of the Crusades in the Recueil des historiens des croisades. Translation published in 1881 (see below).
 The History of the Crusades, 3 volumes (1852). Translated by British author William Robson (1785–1863). With a biographical notice on the author and preface and supplementary chapter by American essayist Hamilton W. Mabie (1846–1916). Covers the period 300–1095, the First through Eighth Crusades, attempted Crusades against the Turks from 1291 to 1396, Crusades against the Turks from 1453 to 1481, and commentary on the status of Europe from 1571 to 1685.
 History of the Crusades, 2 volumes (1875). An edition of Histoire des Croisades, translated by W. Robson, and illustrated by Gustave Doré with 100 grand compositions.Charles Mills. Charles Mills (1788–1826), an English historian.Bibliothèque nationale de France {BnF Data}. "Charles Mills (1788-1826)".

 History of the Crusades for the Recovery and Possession of the Holy Land, 2 volumes (1820). A complete history of nine Crusades (the first eight numbered), with pre-Crusades material and commentary. Mills praises the works of Thomas Fuller and Sharon Turner, but disparages Gibbon's work as superficial. Volume 1 covers the First and Second Crusades, with no mention of the Crusade of 1101, and does not paint a good picture of the Western invaders of the Holy Land. Volume 2 covers the Third through Eighth Crusades, plus Lord Edward's Crusade and the loss of Acre.George Procter. Major George Procter (1795–1842), an English historian.

 History of the Crusades (1854). Comprising the rise, progress and results of the various extraordinary European expeditions for the recovery of the Holy Land from the Saracens and Turks. A discussion of the causes of the wars and the numbered eight Crusades, with commentary on consequences; and 150 original illustrations.Alexis Paulin Paris. Alexis Paulin Paris (1800–1881), a French philologist and author.Bibliothèque nationale de France {BnF Data}. "Paulin Paris (1800-1881)".

 Grandes chroniques de France, 6 volumes (1836-1840). Alexis Paris, editor. Traces the history of the French kings from their origins in Troy to the death of Philip II of France (1223). Its final form brought the chronicle down to the death of Charles V of France in the 1380s. Source material included Historia Caroli Magni. and Vita Karoli Magni.René de Mont-Louis. René de Mont-Louis (1818-1883), a French historian who also wrote under the name Charles Farine.

 Histoire des Croisades (1846), writing as Charles Farine. Covering the First through Eighth Crusades, and the history of the Holy Land from 800 to 1453 and the influence of the Crusades on the West.
 La Croisade des enfant (1871). An account of the Children's Crusade of 1212.Jacob Isadore Mombert. Jacob Isadore Mombert (1829–1913), an American historian.

 A Short History of the Crusades (1894). A history of the Crusades from the First to the Eighth, continuing to 1312. Includes a detailed section on pilgrimage, particularly Helena's discovery of the True Cross. In addition, it discusses the Albigensian Crusade of 1209–1229.Reinhold Röhricht. Reinhold Röhricht (1842–1905), a German historian of the Crusades, regarded as a pioneer with fellow German historian Heinrich Hagenmeyer (1834–1915) in the history of the kingdom of Jerusalem, laying the foundation for modern Crusader research.

 Regesta Regni Hierosolymitani, MXCVII–MCCXCI (1893), with Additamentum (1904). The biographies of the kings of Jerusalem from 1097 to 1291.
 Geschichte der Kreuzzüge im Umriss (1898). An outline of the history of the Crusades. Covers: the Holy Land pre-1095; pope Urban II and the First Crusade; the kings of Jerusalem through Guy of Lusignan; the Second through Eighth Crusades; minor Crusades and the Children's Crusade; the fall of Acre.

 Encyclopaedistics 
The first encyclopedia article on the Crusades is credited to Denis Diderot in the 18th century. In the 19th and early 20th centuries, three notable encyclopedia articles appeared. These are Philip Schaff's article in the Schaff-Herzog Encyclopaedia of Religious Knowledge; Louis Bréhier's two works on the Crusades and their Bibliography and Sources in the Catholic Encyclopedia; and the work of Ernest Barker in the 11th edition of the Encyclopædia Britannica, later expanded into a separate publication. All three have interesting bibliographies showing histories deemed important at the time.Denis Diderot. Denis Diderot (1713-1784), French author who regarded the effects of the Crusades as "uniformly dire" (Oeuvres, Volume 14).

 Encyclopédie (1751–1772). The entry on Crusades in Volume 2 is based on Voltaire's Histoire des Croisades.Philip Schaff. Philip Schaff (1819–1893), a Swiss theologian and ecclesiastical historian.

 History of the Christian Church, 8 volumes (1858–1867). Volume 5: The Middle Ages from Gregory VII (1049) to Boniface VIII (1294). Chapter VII: The Crusades, covers the First Crusade through the fall of Acre in 1291. Includes discussion on literature.
 Schaff-Herzog Encyclopaedia of Religious Knowledge (1884). Editor of the general work and author of influential article on the Crusades in Volume 3, pp. 315–318. Covers the first eight Crusades (combining the last two into one). Topics include: The First Crusade, 1096–1099; The Second and Third Crusades, 1147–1149, 1189–1192; The Fourth Crusade, 1202–1204; The Fifth, Sixth, and Seventh Crusades, 1228–1270; Power of Papacy Increased, also Intolerance; Devotion Stimulated, Absolution Extended; The Renaissance and Reformation; with extensive bibliography.Louis R. Bréhier. Louis R. Bréhier (1869–1951), a French historian specializing in Byzantine studies.

 Crusades (1908). In the Catholic Encyclopedia. An overview of the history of the Crusades, numbered as eight. Topics include: I. Origin of the Crusades; II. Foundation of Christian states in the East; III. First destruction of the Christian states (1144-1187); IV. Attempts to restore the Christian states and the Crusade against Saint-Jean d'Acre (1192-1198); V. The Crusade against Constantinople (1204); VI. The thirteenth-century Crusades (1217-1252); VII. Final loss of the Christian colonies of the East (1254-1291); VIII. The fourteenth-century Crusade and the Ottoman invasion; IX. The Crusade in the fifteenth century; X. Modifications and survival of the idea of the Crusade.
 Crusades (Bibliography and Sources) (1908). A concise summary of the historiography of the Crusades. In the Catholic Encyclopedia.Ernest Barker. Ernest Barker (1874–1960), an English political scientist.

 Crusades (1911), in the 11th edition of the Encyclopædia Britannica. A summary of the history of the Crusades, with sections on the Meaning of the Crusades, Historical Causes of the Crusades, and Literature of Crusades.
 The Crusades (1923). A later edition of the Encyclopædia Britannica article, edited with additional notes.

 Genealogy 
The genealogies of the ruling classes of Christians and Muslims in the Holy Land during the Crusades period is summarized below. In addition, most modern histories of the Crusades generally include the genealogical charts of the royalty of the Kingdom of Jerusalem and, at a minimum, the Ayyubid dynasty.

 Lignages d’Outremer. Lignages d’Outremer (Lineages of Outremer) was a genealogical study laying out the pedigrees of prominent Crusader families written in 1270. The Lignages traces fifteen noble families of Outremer and Cyprus that descended from Guy and Stephanie of Milly, parents of Philip of Milly. In RHC Lois, Volume 2, Appendix III.
 Les familles d’outremer. Les familles d’outremer (unpublished), by French philologist and historian Charles du Fresne, sieur du Cange (1610–1688). A genealogy of the prominent families of the Kingdom of Jerusalem through 1244, including those of the Knights Templar, Knights Hospitaller and Teutonic Order. The publication and completion of Du Cange's unfinished work was entrusted to French historian Nicolas Rudolphe Taranne (1795–1857). After the latter's death it was continued by French archaeologist Emmanuel Guillaume-Rey (1837–1913).
 Godfrey of Bouillon. The genealogy of Godfrey of Bouillon is provided by Genalogia Comitum Buloniensium and in three Beatæ Idæ Vita about Godfrey's mother Ida of Lorraine (In Acta Santcorum,13 April)  In MPL 155.
 Mohammedan Dynasties. The Mohammedan Dynasties: Chronological and Genealogical Tables with Historical Introductions (1894) by British orientalist and archaeologist Stanley E. Lane-Poole. Includes the dynasties of Egypt, the Levant, Persia, Afghanistan and the Mongols.
 New Islamic Dynasties. The New Islamic Dynasties: A Chronological and Genealogical Handbook  (1996) by C. E. Bosworth provides complete lists of original sources for the dynasties relevant to the Crusades, including the Abbasid, Fatimid, Ayyubid, Mamluk and Seljuk caliphates, sultanates and khanates.
Michaël Eytzinger. Michaël Eytzinger (c. 1530 – 1598), an Austrian genealogist, cartographer and historian, who invented the Ahnentafel genealogical numbering system. Also known as Michael Aitsinger. Eytzinger wrote Terra Promissionis topographice atque historice descripta (1582). The work provides a list of the holy sites arranged in colophons. A portrait of the author and a folded map of the Holy Land are included.
 Other Genealogies. Additional sources for historical materials include Historiens orientaux from RHC whose Introduction provides detailed genealogies for the caliphates and sultanates active during the Crusades. Additional material on the Artuqids is found in the works of ibn al-Azraq al-Fariqi and the Seljuks from 1070 to 1154 in Taef Kamal El-Azhari's work The Seljuks of Syria during the Crusades. The discussion in Documents arméniens of RHC also includes information on the genealogy of the Armenian leaders.

Chivalry 
The practice of chivalry was code of conduct developed in the 12th century and inexplicably linked to the European conduct of the Crusades. It was associated with the medieval institution of knighthood in which behavior was governed by chivalrous social codes. The ideals of chivalry were popularized in medieval literature, particularly the literary cycles known as the Matter of France, relating to the paladins, legendary companions of Charlemagne, and the Matter of Britain, informed by Geoffrey of Monmouth's Historia Regum Britanniae, written in the 1130s, which popularized the legend of King Arthur. Works on chivalry relevant to the Crusades are provided below. The most prominent of these is Sir Walter Scott who provided the seminal work, both fiction and non-fiction, on chivalry.

Jacques Bretel. Jacques Bretel (fl. 1285), a French-language trouvère.

 Le Tournoi de Chauvency, 2 volumes (1 + supplement) (1285). A poem concerning the Tournament of Chauvency. Held in 1285 by Louis V, Count of Chiny, the famed tournament brought together nearly 500 knights from around Europe. Participants included Rudolf I of Germany, Frederick III, Duke of Lorraine and Guy of Dampierre, Count of Flanders. A modern, however fanciful, description of the tournament can be found in The Reign of Chivalry by British historian Richard Barber.
 Roman de Castelain de Couci et de la dame de Fayel (13th century). A romantic poem using the cœur mangémotif, sometimes attributed to the 13th-century trouvère Jakemés. (cf. French Wikipedia, Roman du châtelain de Coucy et de la dame du Fayel)

Ramon Lull. Ramon Lull (1232/1236 – 1315), also known as Raymond Lully or Ramon Llull, a Spanish missionary to the Arab world. Lull was stoned to death in Tunisia in 1315.

 Le Libre del Orde de Cauayleria (1279–1283). Lull's account of the order of chivalry is translated to The book of the Ordre of chyualry, by English writer William Caxton (c. 1422 – c. 1491) and appears as Volume 168 of the Early English Text Society (EETS).

Jean de Vignay. Jean de Vignay (c. 1282/1285 – c. 1350), a French monk and translator.

 De la chose de la chevalerie. On the Matter of Chivalry, a translation of De re militari of Roman writer Vegetius (fl. fourth century).

Geoffroi de Charny. Geoffroi de Charny (1300–1356), a French knight and author. De Charny and his wife are the first recorded owners of the Shroud of Turin, lost after the sack of Constantinople in 1204.

 Book of Chivalry (Livre de chevalerie) (c. 1350). A treatise intended to explain the appropriate qualities for a knight, reform the behavior of the fighting classes, and defend the chivalric ethos against its critics, mainly in clerical circles.

Torquato Tasso. Torquato Tasso (1544–1595), an Italian poet. Widely read before the twentieth century, Tasso was at the forefront of Crusader writing for two centuries. Also known as Le Tasse.

 La Gerusalemme liberata (Jerusalem Delivered), 2 volumes (1581). A reinvention of the First Crusade and the struggle between Christianity and Islam, using both Benedetto Accolti's 1464 work De Bello a Christianis contra Barbaros..., and available original sources. Tasso lionized Godfrey of Bouillon as the ideal military leader.

Jean-Pierre de Bougainville. Jean-Pierre de Bougainville (1722–1763), a French writer.

 Mémoires sur l'ancienne chevalerie: considérée comme un établissement politique & militaire, 3 volumes (1781). Memoirs of ancient chivalry, by Jean-Baptiste de La Curne de Sainte-Palaye. With a preface by J.-P. Bougainville.

Richard Hurd. Richard Hurd (1720–1808), an English Anglican bishop and essayist.

 Letters on Chivalry and Romance (1762). An early literary criticism on the use of chivalry in romance literature and poetry, regarded as a stimulant to such writings.

Horatio Walpole. Horatio Walpole, 4th Earl of Orford (1717–1797), an English writer and art historian who claimed a Crusader pedigree.

 The Castle of Otranto (1764). An adaptation of an Italian story set at the time of the Crusades, regarded as the first gothic novel. Later edition edited by English literary critic Caroline F. E. Spurgeon (1869–1942) includes a preface by the editor and an introduction by Sir Walter Scott.

William Robertson. William Robertson (1721–1793), a Scottish historian. Regarded, with David Hume and Edward Gibbon, as one of the great historians of the British Enlightenment.

 A History of the Middle Ages, 3 volumes in 1 (1850). A later edition of Robertson's 1769 work. Describing the progress of society in Europe from the subversion of the Roman Empire to the beginning of the sixteenth century, confirmed by historical proofs and illustrations: and the history of the reign of the emperor of Germany, Charles V, and of all the kingdoms and states of Europe during his age. The first section discusses the Crusades and chivalry from a societal and philosophical view, rather than historically.

Jean-Baptiste de La Curne de Sainte-Palaye. Jean-Baptiste de La Curne de Sainte-Palaye (1697–1781), a French historian, classicist, philologist and lexicographer.

 Mémoires sur l'ancienne chevalerie: considérée comme un établissement politique & militaire, 3 volumes (1781). Memoirs of ancient chivalry. With a preface by Jean-Pierre de Bougainville (1722–1763).
 Memoirs of Ancient Chivalry: to which are added, the anedotes of the times, from the romance writers and historians of those ages (1784). Translated by Susannah Dawson Dobson (died 1795).

Léon Gautier. Émile Théodore Léon Gautier (1832–1897), a French literary historian.

 La Chevalerie (1884). A comprehensive study of chivalry and its history, renown for its length and lavish drawings. Illustrated by Luc-Olivier Merson (1846–1920), Édouard François Zier (1856–January 1924) and Michał Elwiro Andriolli (1836–1893).

Geoffroi Jacques Flach. Geoffroi Jacques Flach (1846–1919), a French historian.

 Chivalry (1904). Essay in Medieval Civilization: Selected Studies from European Authors, edited by American historian Dana C. Munro.
Edward Vernon Utterson. Edward Vernon Utterson (1775–1856), an English literary antiquary.

 The history of the valiant knight Arthur of Little Britain: A romance of chivalry (1814), translated from the French by John Berners Bourchier (1467–1533).

John Taaffe. John Taaffe (1787-1862), an English historian and Knight Commander of the Sovereign Order of St. John of Jerusalem.

 Padilla: A tale of Palestine (1815). A fictional account of chivalry in the time of Saladin. An account of a Spaniard at Tiberias in 1187 shortly after the fall of Jerusalem.

Henry Hallam. Henry Hallam (1777–1859), an English historian.

 View of the State of Europe during the Middle Ages (1818). Historical dissertations for the fifth through fifteenth centuries for France, Italy, Spain, Germany, and the Greek and Muslim empires. Includes major institutional features of medieval society, the feudal system, the ecclesiastical system, and the political system of England. A final chapter discussed society, commerce, manners, and literature in the Middle Ages.
 L'Europe au Moyen Age, 3 volumes (1821-1822). French edition of View of the State of Europe during the Middle Ages, translated by P. Dudoit and A. R. Borghers.
 Chivalry (1869), in Gibbon's The Crusades.

Charles Mills. Charles Mills (1788–1826), an English historian.

 History of Chivalry; Knighthood and its times, 2 volumes (1825).

Sir Walter Scott. Sir Walter Scott (1771–1832), a Scottish novelist and historian.

 Ivanhoe, 3 volumes (1820)
 Tales of the Crusaders (1825), includes the novels: The Betrothed and The Talisman.
 Count Robert of Paris (1832). A novel set in Constantinople during the buildup of the First Crusade that centers on the relationship between Crusading forces and emperor Alexius I Comnenus.
 Chivalry (1842), in Encyclopædia Britannica, 7th Edition. Volume 6, pp. 592–617.
 Essays on Chivalry and Romance, in Edward Gibbon's The Crusades, AD 1095–1261 (1869).
 Introduction to The Castle of Otranto, by English writer Horatio Walpole, describing it as the "first modern attempt to found a tale of amusing fiction upon the basis of the ancient romances of chivalry."
Memoirs of the life of Sir Walter Scott, bart, 10 volumes (1839). By Scottish writer John Gibson Lockhart (1794–1854), Scott's son-in-law.

Eleanor Anne Porden. Eleanor Anne Porden (1795–1825), a British Romantic poet.

 Cœur de Lion, or The Third Crusade. A poem, in sixteen books, 2 volumes (1822). A story of the captivity of Richard and the loss of chivalry.

Henry Stebbings. Henry Stebbings (1799–1883), an English historian and editor.

 History of Chivalry and the Crusades, 2 volumes (1829–1830). Volumes 50-51 of Constable's Miscellany, 80 volumes (1826–1834). A discussion of chivalry and history of the first seven Crusades. Volume 2 begins with the death of Godfrey of Bouillon.

G. P. R. James. George Payne Rainsford James (1799–1860), an English novelist and historical writer, holding the honorary office of British Historiographer Royal.

 The History of Chivalry (1830). An account of the Crusades, beginning with the rise of chivalry. Includes: the first three Crusades, with vivid descriptions of the major battles; the death of Saladin; the later Crusades and the loss of Acre; the decline of the military orders.
 The History of Charlemagne (1833).
 A History of the Life of Richard Coeur-de-Lion, King of England (1842).

George William Cox. George William Cox (1827–1902), a British theologian and historian.

 The Crusades (1891). Part of the Epochs of Modern History series. A history of the Holy Land from the capture of Jerusalem by Khosrow II in 611 through the First through Ninth Crusades, arranged chronologically. Includes a section on chivalry.

Stanley Lane-Poole. Stanley Edward Lane-Poole (1854–1931), a British orientalist and archaeologist.

 The Barbary Corsairs (1890). Includes an account of the Spanish Crusade to Mahdia of 1550.
 The Mohammedan Dynasties: Chronological and Genealogical Tables with Historical Introductions (1894). Includes the dynasties of Egypt, the Levant, Persia, Afghanistan and the Mongols.
 Saladin and the Fall of the Kingdom of Jerusalem (1898).
 History of Egypt in the Middle Ages (1901).
 Personal Narrative of a Pilgrimage to Al Madinah and Meccah, 3 volumes (1913). Introduction to the work by British explorer Richard Francis Burton (1821–1890), edited by Lady Isabel Burton (1831–1896).

James M. Ludlow. James Meeker Ludlow (1841–1932), an English historian and novelist.

 The Age of the Crusades (1896). An account of the First Crusade through the fall of Acre in 1291, plus material on chivalry and the feudal system. Includes an extensive bibliography. Volume VI of Ten Epochs of Church History (1896), edited by John Fulton.

Dana Carleton Munro. Dana Carleton Munro (1866–1933), an American historian.

 A Syllabus of Medieval History, 395-1300 (1899). Includes chapters of chivalry, the Byzantine empire, the Saracen empires, and the Crusades. Extended to 1500 by American medieval historian Joseph R. Strayer, published in 1942.

Richard Barber. Richard William Barber (born 1941), a British historian specializing in medieval history and literature.

 The Knight and Chivalry (1971)
 Tournaments: Jousts, Chivalry and Pageants in the Middle Ages (1989). With English historian Juliet Barker.
 The Holy Grail: Imagination and Belief (2004)
 The Reign of Chivalry (2005).

Philology 
Many of the historians of the Crusades are identified as philologists, studying language in oral and written sources. Some of the more prominent ones include the following.

immanuel Bekker. August Immanuel Bekker (1785–1871), a German philologist and critic.

 Historia byzantina. By Byzantine historian Doukas (c. 1400 – 1470). Volume 20 of Corpus Scriptorum Historæ Byzantinæ (CSHB), edited by German philologist I. Bekker.
 Decline and fall of Byzantium to the Ottoman Turks (1975). Translation of Historia byzantina by H. J. Magoulias.

Josef Dobrovský. Josef Dobrovský (1753–1829), a Czech philologist and historian.

 Historia de expeditione Friderici Imperatoris (1827). An edition of Historia de expeditione Friderici imperatoris(History of the Expedition of the Emperor Frederick), or Espeditio Friderici Imperatoris, providing a history of the Third Crusade from 1189 to 1192 with an emphasis on the expedition of Frederick I Barbarossa.

Matthäus Dresser. Matthäus Dresser (1536–1607), a German philologist and historian. A scholar of Greek and Latin, his principal work was on Aristotle. His commentaries reflect a desire to affirm great deeds done by the Germans. (cf. German Wikipedia, Matthäus Dresser)

 Commentary on Reiner Reineck's Chronicon Hierosolymitanum id est, De bello sacro historia, exposita libris XII & nunc primum in lucem edita (1584). A collection of Crusader sources with a commentary by German historian Reinier Reineck (1541–1595). (cf. German Wikipedia, Reiner Reineccius)

Charles du Fresne du Cange. Charles du Fresne, sieur du Cange (1610–1688), a French philologist and historian of the Middle Ages and Byzantium.

 Histoire de l'empire de Constantinople sous les empereurs françois (1657). The first serious study of the Fourth Crusade and the Frankish settlements in Greece.
 Glossarium ad scriptores mediae et infimae Latinitatis, 6 volumes (1678). Glossary of writers in medieval and late Latin. Crucesignati (Tome 2, pp. 1175–1176) discusses Crusader privileges. A new edition and supplement were published by Dom Pierre Carpentier and Maurus Dantine in the 18th century.
 Historia Byzantina, 2 volumes (1680). A history of the Byzantine empire from 395 to 1453. With a description of the city of Constantinople.
 Les familles d'Outremer (unpublished). Genealogy of the royal families of the Kingdom of Jerusalem through 1244. By the decree of the Minister of Public Instruction, the publication and completion of Du Cange's unfinished work was entrusted to Nicolas Rudolphe Taranne. After the latter's death it was continued by French orientalist Emmanuel Guillaume-Rey, published in 1869.
 Glossarium ad scriptores mediae et infimae Graecitatis, 2 volumes (1688). A glossary of Greek writers.
 Paschalion seu Chronicon Paschale (1689). A translation of the 7th century work Chronicon Paschale.
 Annes tes Komnenes porpherogennetou kaisarisses Alexias (1729). Translation of Anna Komnene's Alexiad .

Justus Lipsius. Justus Lipsius (1547–1606) was a Flemish philologist, philosopher and humanist.

 Opera Omnia, 4 volumes (1585). His work on the Crusades was epigrammatic and moral in tone, relying heavily on William of Tyre.

Jean-Baptiste de La Curne de Sainte-Palaye. Jean-Baptiste de La Curne de Sainte-Palaye (1697–1781), a French historian, classicist, philologist and lexicographer.

 Mémoires sur l'ancienne chevalerie: considérée comme un établissement politique & militaire, 3 volumes (1781). Memoirs of ancient chivalry. With a preface by Jean-Pierre de Bougainville (1722–1763).
 Memoirs of Ancient Chivalry: to which are added, the anedotes of the times, from the romance writers and historians of those ages (1784). Translated by Susannah Dawson Dobson (died 1795).
 Memoirs of the Life of Froissart (1801). A biography of Belgian historian Jean Froissart (c. 1337 – c. 1405), to which is added some account of the manuscript of his Chronicle in the Elizabethian library at Breslau, and a complete index by Thomas Johnes.

Alexis Paulin Paris. Alexis Paulin Paris (1800–1881), a French philologist and author.

 Grandes chroniques de France, 6 volumes (1836-1840). Alexis Paris, editor. Traces the history of the French kings from their origins in Troy to the death of Philip II of France (1223). Its final form brought the chronicle down to the death of Charles V of France in the 1380s. Source material included Historia Caroli Magni. and Vita Karoli Magni.
 Oeuvres complètes du roi René, 4 volumes (1844). Editor of the works of René of Anjou (1409–1480), king of Naples and titular king of Jerusalem.
 La Chanson d'Antioche (edition 1848). Twelfth-century chanson de geste about the sieges of Antioch and Jerusalem. Original author identified as Ricard le Pèlerin and recast by Graindor de Douai. Mostly forgotten until 1848 when Alexis Paris published an edition translated by French politician Louis-Clair de Beaupoil comte de Saint-Aulaire (1778–1854). De Beaupoil also translated Goethe's Faust.
 Les historiens des croisades: discours d'ouverture du cours de langue et litterature du Moyen Age. The historians of the crusades: opening speech of the language course and literature of the Middle Ages.
 Les aventures de maître Renart et d'Ysengrin, son compère (1861). A version of the story of the fabled anthropomorphic Reynard the Fox. Other versions include ones by Chaucer and Goethe.
 Guillaume de Tyr et ses continuateurs: texte français du XIIIe siècle, 2 volumes (1879–1880). Translation of the Historia Rerum in Partibus Transmarinis Gestarum by William of Tyre.

Gottlieb L. Tafel. Gottlieb Lukas Friedrich Tafel (1757–1860), a German classical philologist and a pioneer of Byzantine studies in Europe. (cf. German Wikipedia, Gottlieb Lukas Friedrich Tafel)

 Urkunden zur älteren Handels- und Staatsgeschichte der Republik Venedig, mit besonderer Beziehung auf Byzanz und die Levante, 3 volumes (1856–1857). Documents on the earlier commercial and state history of the Republic of Venice, with special reference to Byzantium and the Levant. From the 9th to the end of the 15th century. With German historian Georg Martin Thomas.

Georg Martin Thomas. Georg Martin Thomas (1817–1887), a German philologist and historian. (cf. German Wikipedia, Georg Martin Thomas)

 Urkunden zur älteren Handels- und Staatsgeschichte der Republik Venedig, mit besonderer Beziehung auf Byzanz und die Levante, 3 volumes (1856–1857). Documents on the earlier commercial and state history of the Republic of Venice, with special reference to Byzantium and the Levant. From the 9th to the end of the 15th century. With German historian Gottlieb Lukas Friedrich Tafel.
 Diplomatarium veneto-levantinum sive Acta et diplomata res Venetas, Graecas atque Levantis illustrantia, 1300-1454, 2 volumes (1880–1899). With Italian archivist Riccardo Predelli (1840–1909).

Joseph Müller. Joseph Müller (1825-1895), a German philologist. (cf. German Wikipedian, Joseph Müller)

 Acta et diplomata graeca medii aevi sacra et profana, 6 volumes (1862–1890). With Slovene philologist Franz Miklosich (1813–1891).

Hermann Hagen. Hermann Hagen (1844–1898), a German-Swiss classical philologist. (cf. German Wikipedia, Hermann Hagen)

 Jacobus Bongarsius (1874). A biography of Jacques Bongars (1554–1612).
 Catalogus codicum bernensium (Bibliotheca Bongarsiana) (1875). Edited by H. Hagen.

August Reifferscheid. Karl Wilhelm August Reifferscheid (1835–1887), a German archaeologist and classical philologist.

 Annae Comnenae, Porphyrogenitae, Alexias, 2 volumes (1884).

See also

 Biblical archaeology
 Christian holy places
 Cartography of Jerusalem
 Cartography of Palestine
 Palestine Pilgrims' Text Society (PPTS)

References

Wikipedia articles contravening the Manual of Style for lists of works